Male Hunt is a 1964 comedy film directed by Édouard Molinaro and starring Jean-Claude Brialy, Catherine Deneuve, Marie Laforêt, Claude Rich, Françoise Dorléac and Jean-Paul Belmondo.

Plot
It is the day that Antoine (Jean-Claude Brialy), a Paris advertising man, is to marry the lovely Gisèle (Marie Laforêt) and his best man Julien (Claude Rich), a divorced statistician, tries to talk him out of it with tales of the hard times he had from women, ending in entrapment by his stunning secretary Denise (Catherine Deneuve), a professional virgin. Going into a bistro for a quick drink before they drive to the wedding, the owner Fernand (Jean-Paul Belmondo), a retired villain and pimp, tells the two of his exploits that ended in marriage to pretty but pushy Sophie (Marie Dubois). Antoine decides to run for it, taking one of the tickets for the honeymoon in Greece and giving the other to Fernand. On board ship, he falls for the delectable Sandra (Françoise Dorléac), a professional confidence woman, who cleans him out of his money but in the end agrees to marry him. Fernand comes back with an old millionairess, former brothel owner, who drives a Rolls. At the wedding of Antoine and Sandra, Julien falls for a sweet brunette.

Cast
 Jean-Claude Brialy as Antoine Monteil
 Claude Rich as Julien Brenot
 Jean-Paul Belmondo as Fernand
 Marie Laforêt as Gisèle
 Jacqueline Mille as Odette
 Marie Dubois as Sophie
 Yvon Sarray as Sophie's father
 Bernard Meunier as Sophie's boyfriend
 Micheline Presle as Isabelle Lartois
 Michel Serrault as Gaston Lartois
 Bernadette Lafont as Flora
 Mireille Darc as Georgina
 Tanya Lopert as Mauricette
 Catherine Deneuve as Denise Heurtin
 Bernard Blier as Mr. Heurtin
 Françoise Dorléac as Françoise Bricart
 Francis Blanche as Kino Papatakis
 Hélène Duc as Madame Armande
 Noël Roquevert as the stepfather
 Patrick Thévenon as Hubert
 Jacques Dynam as a mobster
 Henri Attal as a mobster
 Dominique Zardi as a mobster

Reception
La Chasse à l'homme recorded admissions of 1,664,555 in France.

References

External links
 
 
 La Chasse à l'homme at Le Film Guide

1964 films
1964 comedy films
1960s French films
1960s French-language films
1960s Italian films
Films directed by Édouard Molinaro
Films with screenplays by Michel Audiard
French black-and-white films
French comedy films
French-language Italian films
Italian comedy films
Italian black-and-white films